Patos is a municipality of the state of Paraíba in the Northeast Region of Brazil. It is classified by the Brazilian Institute of Geography and Statistics as a sub-regional center A.

It is located in the Espinharas River valley, surrounded by the Borborema Plateau to east and south, and by the pediplain Sertanejo to the west. It originated from the village of Patos, spun off from the Parish of Nossa Senhora do Bom Sucesso de Pombal on October 6, 1788.

The city is 306 km from the city of João Pessoa, the center of its immediate and intermediate geographic regions. It stands out as an educational, commercial, banking, religious and health center, both in the back country of Paraíba, and in areas of Pernambuco and Rio Grande do Norte. It is the third most important municipality in the state considering the economic, political and social aspects (behind João Pessoa and Campina Grande). According to IBGE estimates for 2021, it is the fourth most populous municipality in the state with 108,766 inhabitants. 

Esporte and Nacional are the city's two football (soccer) clubs. They play at the José Cavalcanti Municipal Stadium. There are four multisport arenas: Rivaldão, AABB, SESC and SESI.

The city is served by Brig. Firmino Ayres Airport.

Climate
The city of Patos experiences a tropical hot semi-arid climate (Köppen: BSh) with a short rainy season from February to April. During this period, when the equatorial rainband associated with the highly seasonalized positioning of the Intertropical Convergence Zone is over the city, warm to hot temperatures and abundant equatorial rainfall prevail. Conversely, the dry season dominates the remaining majority of the year, with abundant sunshine prevalent from May to January. The wettest month is March, with an average monthly precipitation of 213 mm (8.38 in), while the driest month is September, with an average precipitation of only 1 mm (0.04 in).

See also
 List of municipalities in Paraíba

References

External links 
 
 CPRM – Serviço Geológico do Brasil
 Prefeitura Municipal de Patos
 FAMUP

Municipalities in Paraíba